Cláudio Roberto da Silva (born 29 May 1976), commonly known as Cláudio Caçapa or simply Caçapa, is a Brazilian former professional footballer who played as a central defender. Having made his senior debut in 1996 for Atlético Mineiro, Caçapa went on to play for Lyon, Newcastle United, Cruzeiro, Évian and Avaí. He was capped three times by the Brazil national team. Since 2016, he is the assistant manager of Olympique Lyon.

Club career

Atlético Mineiro
Caçapa began his career in 1996 with Brazilian club Atlético Mineiro, where he established himself as a first team regular. He received the Bola de Ouro (Golden Ball) award in 1999 after being voted the best defender in Série A that season.

Lyon
In 2001, Caçapa began attracting interest from European clubs and joined Lyon on loan in 2001. He played his first game in the French Ligue 1 championship on 17 February 2001 and scored in the 2001 Coupe de la Ligue Final which Lyon won after extra time. In the summer, he signed a five-year contract with the club. He was captain of Lyon for five seasons, winning the French championship in each of these seasons. He became a French citizen in October 2006 after living in the country for over five years.
 
His contract with Lyon expired in the summer of 2007 and he refused to sign a new deal with the club.

Newcastle United
Caçapa signed for Newcastle United on a Free transfer after his contract with previous club Lyon expired, on 3 August 2007, signing an initial two-year deal with an option for a third. He made his debut for Newcastle as an 89th-minute substitute during the goalless draw against Aston Villa on 18 August, and in doing so he became the 1,000th player to represent the Magpies in a competitive match.

He made his home debut for Newcastle in a 2–0 win over Barnsley on 29 August, and then his Premier League home debut three days later in a 1–0 win over Wigan Athletic on 1 September. He scored his first goal for the club with a header against Tottenham Hotspur on 22 October in a 3–1 win.

On 3 November, Caçapa suffered a setback, being substituted out of Newcastle's game against Portsmouth after only 18 minutes. It was later announced that his poor play in the game was due to a "slight hamstring strain". Caçapa made a triumphant return to the Newcastle squad on 15 December, when he was named Man of the Match in their away win at Fulham.

He scored his second goal for Newcastle on 16 January 2008 when they went through to the FA Cup 4th Round after a 4–1 replay victory over Stoke City with Caçapa getting the second goal.

He was ruled out for five weeks on 22 March after suffering a groin injury before the 2–0 win over Fulham.
Caçapa had an indifferent 2007–08 campaign, he was in and out of the starting XI, and although turning in some impressive performances, he struggled for consistency.

In the 2008–09 season he was utilised both as a defender and a midfielder due to Newcastle having both a small squad and numerous injuries to players. Most of Caçapa's 2008–09 campaign was blighted by injury. He made his last appearance in December, failing to appear throughout 2009 as Newcastle were relegated before being released on 1 July 2009 when his contract expired.

Cruzeiro
After the Newcastle contract expired, he joined Atlético Mineiro archrivals Cruzeiro, where he played until the end of the 2010 Campeonato Brasileiro Série A.

Évian
Caçapa returned to France to join Évian in the Ligue 2 when he signed for a six-months contract on 25 January 2011. He helped the club to win the Ligue 2 and achieve promotion to the Ligue 1 for their first time in their history.

Avaí
After his contract with Évian expired, he has received an offer from Avaí and agreed to sign for the club on 25 July 2011. He was released from his contract after the end of the season and announced his retirement on 20 March 2012, also opening a football school called Arena Lyon in his hometown Lavras.

International career
Caçapa's impressive form at Atlético Mineiro was rewarded with a call-up to the Brazilian national team. He made his debut for his country on 23 February 2000 against Thailand and went on to make three international appearances and one unofficial international appearance in a match against Japanese club Tokyo Verdy.

Managerial career
Caçapa was hired as the manager of Brazil's under 15 national team in December 2013. He was, however, sacked on 27 February 2015. He was appointed as the assistant manager of Lyon in January 2016.

Personal life
He and his wife had their first child in 2006.

Honours

Club
Atlético Mineiro
Campeonato Mineiro: 1997
Copa CONMEBOL: 1997

Lyon
 Ligue 1: 2001–02, 2002–03, 2003–04, 2004–05, 2005–06, 2006–07
 Coupe de la Ligue: 2000–01
 Trophée des Champions: 2002, 2003, 2004, 2005, 2006

Évian
Ligue 2: 2010–11

References

External links

1978 births
Living people
People from Lavras
Brazilian footballers
Brazil international footballers
Association football central defenders
Clube Atlético Mineiro players
Olympique Lyonnais players
Thonon Evian Grand Genève F.C. players
Newcastle United F.C. players
Cruzeiro Esporte Clube players
Avaí FC players
2001 FIFA Confederations Cup players
Campeonato Brasileiro Série A players
Ligue 1 players
Premier League players
Brazilian expatriate footballers
Brazilian expatriate sportspeople in England
Expatriate footballers in England
Brazilian expatriate sportspeople in France
Expatriate footballers in France
Sportspeople from Minas Gerais